Kofi Nti Boakye (born 5 April 1987) is a Ghanaian football player who plays as a striker or attacking midfielder.

Career

Early career 
Former member of Ghana Academicals, he scored 8 goals in 15 League matches 2005 and was member of the Ghana Premier League All Star team 2007. Boakye began his career with Corners Babies in 2003. He later went on to join Ghanaian Premier League club Liberty Professionals FC aiding the club in taking the WAFU Cup and President Cup.

Heart of Lions 
In 2008, Boakye joined Ghanaian Premier League club Heart of Lions playing for two seasons. He also assisted the club in qualifying for the African Confederation Cup.

Asante Kotoko 
Boakye later signed with Ghanaian Premier League club Asante Kotoko. He played for two seasons with the premier club and later became the Captain of the team. They went on to take the MTN FA Cup and qualified in the African Confederation Cup.

Al Ahli SC 
In 2013, Boakye signed with Libyan side Al Ahli SC, He also played for Egyptian side Misr Lel Makkasa for another season before going on to play for Ifeanyi Ubah FC in 2015.

Shabab Al 
In September 2017, Boakye Lebanese Premier League side Al Shabab.

International career 
Boakye's first call up for the Ghana national football team was for a friendly match against Argentina national football team in September 2009. On 30 September 2009, during the friendly match, he started the match and played 57th minutes to mark his international debut.

Personal life 
He is the brother of Isaac Boakye, the German-based player.

Honours

Club 
Asante Kotoko

 Ghana Premier League: 2011–12, 2012–13

Al Ahli

 Libyan Premier League: 2013–14

Ifeanyi Ubah

 Nigeria FA Cup: 2016

References

External links
 Player profile
 
 IM Scouting Profile

1987 births
Living people
Ghanaian footballers
Association football forwards
Liberty Professionals F.C. players
Asante Kotoko S.C. players
Heart of Lions F.C. players
Al-Ahli SC (Tripoli) players
Misr Lel Makkasa SC players
Al-Qaisumah FC players
Ghanaian expatriate sportspeople in Egypt
Expatriate footballers in Egypt
Ghanaian expatriate sportspeople in Libya
Expatriate footballers in Libya
Ghanaian expatriate sportspeople in Saudi Arabia
Expatriate footballers in Saudi Arabia
Egyptian Premier League players
Saudi First Division League players
Ghana international footballers
Libyan Premier League players